Mehmed Džemaludin Effendi Čaušević (28 December 1870 – 28 March 1938) was a Bosnian Muslim theologian, thinker, educator, reformer, journalist, translator and linguist, the fourth Grand Mufti (Reis-ul-Ulema) in the period of the Kingdom of Yugoslavia. He was one of the most significant and influential Bosniak personalities of the 20th century.

Early life
Mehmed Džemaludin Čaušević was born in northwestern Bosnia, in the village of Arapuša, near Bosanska Krupa. 

His earliest education was obtained at the hands of his father, Ali Hodža, who was a member of the local Islamic clergy. As a teenager Čaušević was enrolled into the madrasa of the nearby city of Bihać where he attracted the attention of its foremost instructor, Mehmed Sabit Ribić (who was also the city’s Mufti).

Education
He was sent to Istanbul at the age of seventeen to receive a higher education in Islamic studies. While in the Ottoman capital Čaušević finished his education in Islamic Studies with high marks and subsequently enrolled in the empire’s law school, the Mekteb-i Hukuk. It was here that he was first exposed to the ongoing modernization that had been instituted in the empire over the last several decades.

There are sources indicating that during the summer months while a student at the Mekteb-i Hukuk, he would, on invitation, travel back to Bosnia in order to speak at various venues. It was already apparent from his lectures at this time that Čaušević was receptive to notions of both religious and societal reform. Moreover he spent some time in Cairo, where he intermittently attended the lectures of the famous Arab reformer Muhammad Abduh (1849-1905). These lectures appear to have had a considerable impact on Čaušević, since he refers to ‘Abduh in his later writings as Ustaz-i muhterem, “Respected Teacher.” 
Upon graduating from the Mekteb-i Hukuk, in 1901, Čaušević departed from Istanbul and returned to Bosnia.

Return to Bosnia and Herzegovina
The turn of the 20th century was a period of great cultural and political transformation within Bosnia and Herzegovina, and it was also a time when Džemaludin Čaušević emerged as an individual who was well-versed and capable in both traditional Islamic theology as well as modern science and thought. Bosnian Muslim society struggled to endure the psychological anxiety of being ruled by traditionally antagonistic forces (both Austria and later, Serb-dominated Yugoslavia). As a result tens of thousands of Bosnian Muslims abandoned their homeland, seeking refuge in hicret, or immigration, to lands still under Muslim rule.

Needless to say, this flight triggered not only considerable alterations to Bosnia and Herzegovina's demographic make-up, but an incredible brain-drain on Bosnia and Herzegovina's Muslim society as well. Yet at a time when it was popular for educated and religious people to leave their land for what was left of the Ottoman Empire, Džemaludin Čaušević did the reverse by instead abandoning his residency in Istanbul and returning to his homeland to assist it in a time when it was suffering through immense and painful transformations, a time when the continued existence of the Bosnian Muslim people came into serious question.

Activities in Islam in Bosnia and Herzegovina
Making his residence in Sarajevo, he served as an instructor of the Arabic language in the city’s Great Gymnasium. In September 1903, he was elected to be a member of the distinguished Meclis-i Ulema, the managerial body of Bosnia and Herzegovina Islamic Community. Following this appointment Čaušević was made responsible for overseeing religious educational institutions and in this capacity he traveled throughout Bosnia and Herzegovina to inspect the conditions of the country’s mektebs ("schools") and medreses. Traljić maintains that these inspections, “were the first of their sort”, and even more so that they
“strengthened Čaušević’s conviction that there would be no progress among Bosnian Muslims, especially in the religious sense, without reform and the advancement of religious education.”

In 1909 Čaušević accepted a position as professor in Sarajevo’s Sharia school, an institution dedicated to higher Islamic learning and which was, built and financed by the Austrians. Always true to his reformist ideals, Čaušević never ceased to declare and strive to implement them. Soon his reputation for dedication and distinction in the field of education spread throughout Bosnia and Herzegovina, and when Hafiz Sulejman Šarac (1850-1927) resigned from his position as reis-ul-ulema in 1913, Čaušević was selected a year later to be his successor. Thus he was presented with the highest and most prestigious religious rank within the Islamic community of Bosnia-Hercegovina: 
“On March 26, 1914, on the very eve of World War I, Čaušević was proclaimed the reis-ul-ulema of the Islamic community in Bosnia and Herzegovina. He remained in that position until 1930, when he resigned because of disagreements with the Yugoslav government over the administration of vakfs (Muslim charitable organisations) and religious positions in Yugoslavia.”

Following his retirement from this post in 1930, Čaušević continued to be an active participant in Islamic intellectual discourse through contributions to literary papers (some of which he established). Together with Hafiz Muhamed Pandža, he also translated the Qur’an into Croatian language and attached his forward-looking exegesis to it. On March 28, 1938 Džemaludin Čaušević, a man widely regarded as a symbol of hope for the enlightenment and upliftment of the Bosnian Muslims and their culture and traditions, died.

Čaušević and other reformers' legacy
As with other Muslim reformers of his generation, Džemaludin Čaušević had the same objective in mind for his people, and he employed the same rhetoric and methodology: use of the printing press, allowing for women to uncover their faces, calling for educational reforms, etc. The rhetoric that he used was evocative of other reformist calls throughout the Muslim Middle East and Central Asia. He censured his fellow Muslims for having drifted into the “deep sleep” of apathy and defeatism: 
“Muslims fell into a deep sleep, from which they were not able to wake up until the Europeans, with their weapons of knowledge and all sorts of inventions, came to the door of their house and demonstrated the divine truth: Knowledge and ignorance cannot be equal, knowledge always triumphs over ignorance.”

The focal point that reform and modernity evolved around for all Muslim reformers was knowledge; for “knowledge always triumphs over ignorance”, and they believed that Muslims must have fallen into ignorance, in view of the fact that the Europeans had triumphed over them. Now this knowledge (which the Muslims once possessed when they knew how to interpret the Qur’an correctly) had to be regained, and the Europeans, as well as other advanced nations, should be used as models for proficiency and advancement. Muslims needed to learn from Europe to regain the worldly wisdom they once possessed. Seeing that most of these reformers were sincere believers, they did not question the authenticity of the Qur’an, and in fact they sought to reinterpret the Qur’an so that its real message became the search for knowledge, accompanied by moral and material enrichment.

Death
Džemaludin Čaušević died in 1938, on the eve of World War II.

References

Sources
Karić, Enes & Demirović, Mujo; Reis Džemaludin Čaušević: Prosvjetitelj i reformator. Ljiljan, Sarajevo, 2002.
Traljić, Mahmud, Islamska Misao H. Mehmeda Džemaludina Čauševića. Rijaset Islamske Zajednice, Sarajevo, 1998.

|-

1870 births
1938 deaths
Bosniaks of Bosnia and Herzegovina
Bosnia and Herzegovina Muslims
Bosnia and Herzegovina Sunni Muslims
Bosnia and Herzegovina imams
People from Bosanska Krupa
20th-century imams
Grand Muftis of Bosnia and Herzegovina
Istanbul University Faculty of Law alumni